The 2014–15 Croatian Women's First Football League (Prva hrvatska nogometna liga za žene) was the twenty fourth season of Croatian Women's First Football League, the national championship for women's association football teams in Croatia, since its establishment in 1992.

The league was contested by 10 teams, two more than in the previous season. ŽNK Osijek were the defending champions, having won their eighteenth title in 2013–14.

In April 2015, Rijeka-Jack Pot announced their withdrawal from the competition. According to the competition rulebook since they quit during the first half of the second part of the season, the matches played in the first part of the season were considered valid and all further matches were considered as not played. They played only one match in the second part of the season, a 5–1 loss against Viktorija.

Teams

The following is a complete list of teams who are contesting the 2014–15 Prva HNLŽ.

League table

Results

External links
Croatian Women's First Football League at UEFA.com
Croatian Women's First Football League at Croatian Football Federation website
Croatian Women's First Football League at soccerway.com

Croatian Women's First Football League seasons
Croatia
women
Football
Football